The Miminegash Range Lights were a set of range lights on Prince Edward Island, Canada. They were built in 1886, and deactivated in 1972; only the rear tower has survived.

See also
List of lighthouses in Prince Edward Island

References

External links
Picture of Miminegash Front Range Light Lighthouse Friends
 Aids to Navigation Canadian Coast Guard

Lighthouses completed in 1886
Lighthouses in Prince Edward Island